Barry Watson may refer to:

Barry Watson (actor) (born 1974), American actor
Barry Watson (athlete) (born 1944), British long-distance athlete
Barry Watson (producer), American television producer